Mouloudia Club d'Oran (handball) (Arabic: نادي مولودية وهران لكرة اليد), referred to as MC Oran HB for a short, is an Algerian handball team based in Oran, that plays  in the Algerian Handball Championship.

Honours

National titles 
 Algerian Handball Championship
Champion (2): 1983, 1992
 Algerian Handball Cup
Champion (2): 1984, 1986
Runners-up (6): 1979, 1982, 1985, 1988, 1989, 1999

International titles 
 African Handball Cup Winners' Cup
Champion (1): 1987
Runner-up (1): 1988
 Arab Club Handball Championship
Champion (3): 1983, 1984, 1988
Runner-up (1): 1994
Third place (1): 1985
 Arab Handball Championship of Winners' Cup
Fourth place (1): 1999

Women's section

Algerian Women's Handball Cup 
Champion (1): 1987

Notable players 

  Abdelkrim Bendjemil
  Abdeslam Benmaghsoula
  Chemseddine Bensenouci
  Houari Besbes
  Nacereddine Bessedjerari
  Abdeldjalil Bouanani
  Mohamed Bouziane
  Djamel Doballah
  Mustapha Doballah
  Sofiane Elimam
  Jamel Harrat
  Ali Houd
  Bouâa Mekhloufi
  Salim Nedjel
  Nourreddine Hamdoune

References

External links
  Officiel website
  Fun website

Handball
Sport in Oran
Algerian handball clubs
Handball clubs established in 1977
1977 establishments in Algeria